The Scottish Mixed Curling Championship is the national mixed curling championship for Scotland.  Team are composed of two men and two women, playing in alternating positions up the team, meaning the lead and third must be of the same gender, and likewise the second and fourth players. The championship has been held annually since 1976.

From 2005 to 2014 the winners progressed to represent Scotland at the European Mixed Curling Championship. Since 2015 the winners have represented Scotland at the World Mixed Curling Championship.

The current champions are Luke Carson, Kirsten Bousie, Mark Taylor and Katie McMillan, who went on to win their round robin group in the 2019 World Mixed Championship before losing to Germany in the quarterfinals. Team Carson beat out six other teams to claim the 2019 Championship, which was contested between 24 and 26 May at The Peak in Stirling.

The 2020 edition of the tournament will take place between 22 and 24 May 2020, again at The Peak in Stirling.

Previous Winners

Teams are listed in the order fourth-lead. Skips are denoted in bold.

References

See also
Scottish Men's Curling Championship
Scottish Women's Curling Championship
Scottish Mixed Doubles Curling Championship
Scottish Junior Curling Championships
Scottish Senior Curling Championships
Scottish Schools Curling Championship
Scottish Wheelchair Curling Championship

Curling competitions in Scotland
National curling championships
Recurring sporting events established in 1976
1976 establishments in Scotland
Annual sporting events in the United Kingdom
Annual events in Scotland
Scottish